The Copenhagen School is a group of scholars dedicated to the study of linguistics, centered around Louis Hjelmslev (1899–1965) and the Linguistic Circle of Copenhagen (French: Cercle Linguistique de Copenhague, Danish: Lingvistkredsen), founded by him and Viggo Brøndal (1887–1942). In the mid twentieth century the Copenhagen school was one of the most important centres of linguistic structuralism together with the Geneva School and the Prague School. In the late 20th and early 21st century the Copenhagen school has turned from a purely structural approach to linguistics to a functionalist one, Danish functional linguistics, which nonetheless incorporates many insights from the founders of the Linguistic Circle of Copenhagen.

History
The Copenhagen School of Linguistics evolved around Louis Hjelmslev and his developing theory of language, glossematics. Together with Viggo Brøndal he founded the Cercle Linguistique de Copenhague in 1931, a group of linguists based on the model of the Prague Linguistic Circle. Within the circle the ideas of Brøndal and Hjelmslev were not always compatible. Hjelmslev’s more formalist approach attracted a group of followers, principal among them Hans Jørgen Uldall and Eli Fischer-Jørgensen, who would strive to apply Hjelmslev's abstract ideas of the nature of language to analyses of actual linguistic data. 

Hjelmslev’s objective was to establish a framework for understanding communication as a formal system, and an important part of this was the development of precise terminology to describe the different parts of linguistic systems and their interrelatedness. The basic theoretical framework, called “Glossematics” was laid out in Hjelmslev’s two main works: Prolegomena to a theory of Language and Résumé of a theory of Language. However, since Hjelmslev's death in 1965 left his theories mostly on the programmatic level, the group that had formed around Hjelmslev and his glossematic theory dispersed—while the Copenhagen Linguistic Circle continued to exist, it was not really a "school" united by a common theoretical perspectives. 

In 1989, a group of members of the Copenhagen Linguistic Circle, inspired by the advances in cognitive linguistics and the functionalist theories of Simon C. Dik founded the School of Danish Functional Grammar aiming to combine the ideas of Hjelmslev and Brøndal, and other important Danish linguists such as Paul Diderichsen and Otto Jespersen with modern functional linguistics. Among the prominent members of this new generation of the Copenhagen School of Linguistics were Peter Harder, Elisabeth Engberg-Pedersen, Frans Gregersen, Una Canger and Michael Fortescue. The basic work of the school is Dansk Funktionel Grammatik (Danish Functional Grammar) by Harder (2006). Recent developments in the school include Ole Nedergaard Thomsen’s Functional Discourse Pragmatics. In the following the two stages of the Copenhagen School will be described as 1. The glossematic school and 2. Danish functional linguistics.

The glossematic school

Brøndal emphasised that formal properties of a system should be kept apart from its substance. Accordingly, Hjelmslev presented, as the key figure of Copenhagen School in the 1930s, a formal linguistic fundament, which was later known as glossematics (the double duality of the linguistic sign). He formulated his linguistic theory together with Hans Jørgen Uldall as an attempt to analyse the expression (phonetics and grammar) and the meaning of a language on a coherent basis. He assumed that language was not the only instrument of communication (cf. the communication of deaf), and he was interested in a general theory of the signs of communication, semiotics or semiology.

More than the other schools, the Glossematic School referred to the teachings of Saussure, even though it was in many aspects connected with older traditions. Thus, it tried once more to combine logics and grammar. At any rate, Hjelmslev has taken over the psychological interpretation of the linguistic sign and thereby extended his study of the sign further than language as such.

The principal ideas of the school are:
 A language consists of content and expression.
 A language consists of a succession and a system.
 Content and expression are interconnected by commutation.
 There are certain relations in the succession and the system.
 There are no one-to-one correspondents between content and expression, but the signs may be divided into smaller components.

Even more than Saussure, the Copenhagen School is interested in the langue rather than parole. It represented in a pure form the idea that language is a form and not a substance. It studied the relational system within the language on a higher level of abstraction.

Danish functional linguistics

The school of Danish functional linguistics (DFL) was developed in an attempt to combine modern functional grammar and cognitive linguistics with the best ideas and concepts of the earlier structuralist school. Like Hjelmslev and Saussure, the approach insists on the basic structural division of communication in planes of content and expression. Like Simon Dik and functionalist grammarians, Danish functionalists also insist that language is fundamentally a means of communication between humans and is best understood and analysed through its communicative function. When analysing linguistic utterances, the content and expression planes are analysed separately, with the expression plane being analysed through traditional structural methods and the content plane being analysed mostly through methods from semantics and pragmatics. However, it is assumed that structures on the expression plane mirror structures on the content plane. This can be seen in the parallelism between the structure of Danish sentences as described by the structural syntactic model of Paul Diderichsen dividing utterances into three basic fields: a foundation field, a nexus field and a content field; and the pragmatic structure of utterances that often uses the foundation field for discourse pragmatic functions, the nexus field for illocutionary functions and the content field for the linguistic message. Danish functionalists assume that an utterance is not to be analysed from the minimal units and up, but rather from the maximal units and down, because speakers begin the construction of utterances by choosing what to say in a given situation, then by choosing the words to use and finally by building the sentence by means of sounds.  

An example of a two planed analysis is given below in the analysis of the utterance "The book hasn't been read by anyone for a while". The Expression plane consists of "the book" which is a noun phrase with a determiner, a finite verb with a negational adverb "hasn't", and a passive verbal phrase "been read" with an agent "by anyone" and a time adverb "for a while". On the content plane "the book" has the function of topic of the utterance, that which the sentence is about and which links it to the larger discourse, the function of "hasn't" is to state the illocutionary force of the declarative utterance, and the predicate is the message "hasn't been read by anyone for a while" which is intended to be communicated. 

An example of a descriptive work within Danish functional linguistics is the 2011 grammar of Danish by Erik Hansen & Lars Heltoft, Grammatik over det Danske Sprog (Grammar over the Danish Language).

Notes

Bibliography
 Harder, Peter (2006): “Funktionel lingvistik — eksemplificeret ved dansk funktionel lingvistik”. NyS 34/35. 92-130. (Multivers. Det akademiske Forlag.)
 Harder, Peter. Dansk funktionel Lingvistik: en Introduktion. 
 Engberg-Pedersen, Elisabeth; Michael Fortescue; Peter Harder; Lars Heltoft; Lisbeth Falster Jakobsen (eds.). (1996)  Content, expression and structure: studies in Danish functional grammar. John Benjamins Publishing Company. 
 Harder, Peter. (1996) Functional Semantics: A Theory of Meaning, Structure and Tense in English. (Trends in Linguistics: Studies and Monographs 87). Berlin/New York: Mouton de Gruyter.

External links
Official page of the Linguistic Circle of Copenhagen at the University of Copenhagen

Structuralism
Linguistics organizations
Schools of linguistics